QR code payment is a contactless payment method where payment is performed by scanning a QR code from a mobile app. This is an alternative to doing electronic funds transfer at point of sale using a payment terminal.  This avoids a lot of the infrastructure traditionally associated with electronic payments such as payment cards, payment networks, payment terminal and merchant accounts.

To make a QR code payment, the consumer scans the QR code displayed by the merchant with their smartphone to pay for their goods. They enter the amount they have to pay and finally submit. This is a more secure card-not-present method than others.

History
The QR code system was invented in 1994 by Masahiro Hara from the Japanese company Denso Wave. 

The first mobile wallet app for cryptocurrency Bitcoin featured the ability to send and receive payments with QR codes in March 2011. In 2011, Chinese company Alipay designed a QR code payment method which allowed partnering offline stores to accept payment by scanning an individual’s QR code in Alipay Wallet. In 2014, Chinese technology company Tencent introduced a similar feature on its messaging app WeChat to allow its users to make QR code payments. QR code payment has helped mobile payment become the most popular method of payments in China, accounting for 83% of all payments as of 2018. Nearly all shops, street vendors, most metro systems, buses, and taxis in Mainland China accept either WeChat Pay, Alipay, or Cloud QuickPass for payment.

In 2017, the National Payments Corporation of India (NPCI) launched BharatQR as a single, interoperable QR code that could be used for making payments to and from bank accounts using UPI and wallets. It works alongside QR codes from wallet providers as well as card providers such as Visa's mVisa and Mastercard's Masterpass.

In 2020, PayPal announced the ability to pay with QR codes in its mobile app.

Usage by industry

Transportation

China 

Most metro systems, buses, and taxis in Mainland China accept either WeChat Pay or Alipay for payment. The national railway operator, China Railway, also accepts the two major apps for payment.

India 
Line 1 of the Mumbai Metro in India allows users to purchase a ticket on their phones using QR code payments. Instead of swiping an RFID card or single-use token, a QR code is generated on the Paytm app which is then read by a scanner mounted on the turnstile.

Malaysia
QR code payment is becoming increasingly popular recently in Malaysia as a convenient and secure way to pay for transportation services. KTM ETS and KTM Komuter Northern Sector, as well as KLIA Ekspres and Penang Ferry Service, are all offering QR code payments to their passengers.

Passengers can purchase their tickets online via the application or website of these transportation services. After purchasing the ticket, a QR code is generated which can be scanned using a mobile phone or a printed ticket with a QR code. Passengers can then enter and pass through the fare gate directly, without the need to redeem a physical ticket.

As Malaysia continues to modernize its transportation infrastructure, it is likely that more services including Rapid KL will adopt QR code payments to enhance the passenger experience and streamline operations.

Integrated QR code payment systems

ASEAN Integrated QR Code Payment System 
This integrated QR code payment system allows people to make transactions with banks or e-money that supports their local integrated QR code payment system in any of the participating countries. Local currencies are used in these transactions, meaning that transactions in Thailand using an Indonesian payment app will directly exchange rupiah with baht. Currently, three of the QR code payment systems in ASEAN are connected (Indonesia, Malaysia and Thailand). Singapore and the Philippines are also planning to integrate their QR payment systems. The following are QR Payment systems that are in or soon will be in the integrated pament system.

QRIS (Quick Response Code Indonesian Standard) 

QRIS is a standardized national QR payment system for Indonesia launched by Bank Indonesia on August 17, 2019. Almost all payment services in Indonesia support this system, including GoPay, OVO, ShopeePay, BCA, and BRI. It combines all the separate QR codes from different payment services into one QR code which can be used by merchants to receive payments from any e-wallets or banks that supports QRIS.

DuitNow 
DuitNow allows all participating banks and e-wallets in Malaysia to use the same QR Code for transactions. It is launched by PayNet under the Bank Negara Malaysia's Interoperable Credit Transfer Framework (ICTF). Some of the banks and e-wallets that support this payment system are CIMB, HSBC, GrabPay, ShopeePay, OCBC, UOB, ICBC, and more.

Thai QR Payment 
Thai QR Payment (Promptpay) integrates QR payment systems in Thailand. It was launched by the Bank of Thailand.

SGQR (Singapore Quick Response Code) 

SGQR is a unified QR code payment system launched on September 17, 2018. SGQR combines multiple QR codes used by multiple payment services in Singapore, including PayNow, into one QR code. This scheme is co-owned by MAS and IMDA.

QR Ph 
QR Ph is the QR code standard in the Philippines, approved by the Philippines Payment Management, inc. (PPMI) in accordance with circular 1055 of the Bangko Sentral ng Pilipinas. The system is based on the Europay-Mastercard-VISA (EMV) standard, allowing one QR Code to serve transactions from different banks and e-wallets.

See also 
 Short Payment Descriptor

References

Payment systems
Mobile payments
Japanese inventions
1994 introductions
2011 introductions